The I Am Music II Tour (also referred as I Am Still Music Tour), was a North American concert tour headlined by American rapper Lil Wayne, and with several special guests. The tour was announced on January 24, 2011, and the tickets went on sale on February 4.

Opening Acts

Leg One:
Nicki Minaj
Rick Ross
Travis Barker
Mixmaster Mike

Leg Two:
Keri Hilson
Rick Ross
Lloyd
Far East Movement

Setlist

Tour dates

References

2011 concert tours
Lil Wayne